The northern part of Azad Jammu and Kashmir encompasses the lower part of the Himalayas, including Jamgarh Peak (15,531 feet, or 4,734 meters). However, Sarwali peak in the Neelum Valley is the highest peak in the state. Fertile, green, mountainous valleys are characteristic of Azad Kashmir's geography, making it one of the most beautiful regions on the subcontinent.

The southern parts of Azad Kashmir including Bhimber, Mirpur and Kotli districts has extremely hot weather in summers and moderate cold weather in winters. It receives rains mostly in monsoon weather.

In the central and northern parts of state weather remains moderate hot in summers and very cold and chilly in winter. Snow fall also occurs there in December and January.

This region receives rainfall in both winters and summers. Muzaffarabad and Pattan are among the wettest areas of the state. Throughout most of the region, the average rainfall exceeds 1400 mm, with the highest average rainfall occurring near Muzaffarabad (around 1800 mm). During summer, monsoon floods of the Jhelum and Leepa river are common, due to high rainfall and melting snow.

Main places
 Ganga Choti
 Neelum Valley
 Sharda
 Arang Kel

Valleys
 Bandala Valley
 Jhelum Valley
 Kas Chanatar
 Leepa Valley
 Neelum Valley
 Samahni Valley
 Bagh Valley
 Gulmarg

Lakes
 Chitta Katha Lake
 Baghsar Lake
 Chhota Gala Lake
 Ganga Lake
 Ratti Gali Lake
 Saral Lake
 Shounter Lake
 Subri Lake

Rivers
 Jhelum River
 Neelum River
 Poonch River
 Shingo River

See also 
 Tourism in Pakistan
 Tourism in Punjab, Pakistan
 Tourism in Balochistan
 Tourism in Khyber Pakhtunkhwa
 Tourism in Gilgit-Baltistan
 Tourism in Sindh
 Tourism in Karachi

References

External links 

Tourism in Azad Kashmir, PTDC
Azad Kashmir Department